Emi Jeen (born Emilie Bernier) is a Canadian alt-pop singer-songwriter from Saint-Jean-Port-Joli, Quebec. Her debut single, "Runaway", was released August 7, 2020. Followed by her debut EP, The Other Side released October 30, 2020. In 2022, she gained attention after viral TikTok video (17 million views) of singing a cover of “Bring Me To Life” by Evanescence. She then released her second project, Why So Serious - EP on Septembre 16th 2022.

Biography 
Emi Jeen started singing with her mom in local clubs, her interest in music evolved into taking classical music singing lessons by the age of 10. In 2010, she attended Concordia University, where she graduated in communication studies. She then toured in 6 Countries from Malaysia to Morocco with the all-girl group, A.K.A. Their song “Hot For Me” was picked up by Ubisoft for their Just Dance 4 video game. In 2015, after returning from her tour the band split, which encouraged Emi to rebrand herself as Emi Jeen and start her solo career.

Discography 
The Other Side (EP, 2020)
Why So Serious (EP, 2022)

References

External links 
Official Website

Living people
Canadian women singer-songwriters
Canadian singer-songwriters
People from Chaudière-Appalaches
Singers from Quebec
21st-century Canadian women singers
Year of birth missing (living people)